Marjorie McIntosh (born 15 November 1940) is an American historian of Great Britain.

Life and work
Marjorie Keniston McIntosh was born in Ann Arbor, Michigan, on 15 November 1940. She graduated from Radcliffe College in 1962 with a B.A. degree magna cum laude in European history. The following year she received a M.A. in English history from Harvard University. McIntosh studied at the Institute of Historical Research in London, England, in 1965–66 and was awarded her Ph.D. in Tudor/Stuart history by Harvard in 1967. She is married with two sons and a daughter. She was appointed an assistant professor of history at the University of Colorado in 1979, promoted to associate professor seven years later, and to full professor in 1992. McIntosh received a Guggenheim Fellowship in 1995. She founded the Center for British Studies at Colorado and served as its first executive director. She has published four books: Autonomy and Community: The Royal Manor of Havering, 1200–1500, A Community Transformed: The Manor and Liberty of Havering, 1500–1620, Order, Control, and Regulation of Behavior in English Communities, 1350–1600, and Local Responses to the Poor in England, 1350–1600.

Notes

References

1940 births
Living people
Radcliffe College alumni
21st-century American historians
People from Ann Arbor, Michigan
American expatriates in the United Kingdom
University of Colorado faculty
American women historians
21st-century American women
Historians from Michigan